Coxelus is a genus of cylindrical bark beetles in the family Zopheridae. There are about 10 described species of Coxelus.

Species
These 10 species belong to the genus Coxelus:
 Coxelus alinae Dajoz, 1973
 Coxelus bituberculatus (Frivaldszky, 1893)
 Coxelus clarus Broun, 1882
 Coxelus grossanus Broun, 1885
 Coxelus insularis (Grouvelle, 1899)
 Coxelus longus
 Coxelus pictus (J.Sturm, 1807)
 Coxelus serratus Horn, 1885
 Coxelus thoracicus Broun, 1895
 Coxelus unicolor Motschulsky, 1863

References

Further reading

External links

 

Zopheridae
Articles created by Qbugbot